Brimstone Peak is a peak,  high, surmounting a small ice-free mesa between the Outpost Nunataks and the Ricker Hills, in the Prince Albert Mountains, Victoria Land. It was mapped by the Southern Party of the New Zealand Geological Survey Antarctic Expedition, 1962–63, which so named it because of coloring which suggested "hellfire and brimstone."

References
 

Mountains of Victoria Land